Dancin' on the Boulevard is the seventeenth studio album by American country music band Alabama, released in 1997 by RCA Records. It includes the singles "Dancin, Shaggin' on the Boulevard", "Sad Lookin' Moon," "She's Got That Look in Her Eyes" and "Of Course I'm Alright". Also included on the album are cover versions of The Temptations' "My Girl" and Bruce Channel's "Hey! Baby". The album peaked at No. 5 on Billboard Country Albums Chart and No. 55 on Billboard 200.

Content
Dancin' on the Boulevard was produced by the band, along with Don Cook. "Sad Lookin' Moon" was the first single-release from the album, peaking at No. 2 on the U.S. country singles charts in 1997. Following it was the title track which, like "Sad Lookin' Moon", was co-written by lead singer Randy Owen along with bass guitarist Teddy Gentry and frequent collaborator Greg Fowler. This song reached #3 on the same chart late that year. "Of Course I'm Alright" followed late in the year and reached No. 22. Finishing off the single releases was "She's Got That Look in Her Eyes", an Owen-Gentry collaboration which peaked at #21.

Two covers are included on the album as well: "Hey! Baby" and "My Girl", originally Number One pop hits for Bruce Channel and The Temptations, respectively.

Critical reception
Thom Owens of Allmusic gave the album a two-star rating out of five, calling it "a fairly predictable and routine record that only catches fire on its singles".

Track listing

Personnel 
As listed in liner notes.

Alabama
 Randy Owen – lead vocals, backing vocals
 Jeff Cook – electric guitars, backing vocals, lead vocals (10)
 Teddy Gentry – bass guitar, backing vocals, lead vocals (5)

Alabama's drummer, Mark Herndon, does not play on the album.

Additional musicians
 John Barlow Jarvis – acoustic piano, keyboards, Hammond B3 organ, Wurlitzer organ, synth bass
 Steve Nathan – acoustic piano, keyboards, Hammond B3 organ
 Mark Casstevens – acoustic guitars
 Brent Rowan – electric guitars, slide guitar, 12-string guitar, mandolin
 Larry Paxton – bass guitar
 Lonnie Wilson – drums, percussion
 Don Jackson – baritone saxophone
 Denis Solee – tenor saxophone
 Dennis Good – trombone
 Chris McDonald – trombone
 Mike Haynes – trumpet
 George Tidwell – trumpet
 Dennis Burnside – horn arrangements and conductor 
 Terry McMillan – harmonica (10)
 Bruce Channel – backing vocals (10)
String section
 Dennis Burnside – string arrangements and conductor 
 John Catchings and Bob Mason – cello 
 Jim Grosjean, Gary Vanosdale and Kristin Wilkinson – viola 
 David Angell, David Davidson, Conni Ellisor, Carl Gorodetzky, Lee Larrison, Pamela Sixfin, Alan Umstead and Catherine Umstead – violin

Production
 Alabama – producers
 Don Cook – producer 
 Mike Bradley – recording, mixing
 Mark Capps – additional recording, recording assistant, mix assistant 
 Bart Pursley – additional recording, recording assistant
 John Dickson – mix assistant 
 Hank Williams – mastering at MasterMix (Nashville, Tennessee)
 Susan Eaddy – art direction
 Bill Brunt – design 
 Blake Morgan – design 
 Peter Nash – photography 
 David Haskell – background photography

Chart performance

Album

Certifications

References

1997 albums
RCA Records albums
Alabama (American band) albums
Albums produced by Don Cook